Lauri Johannes Impiö (8 September 1929, in Ranua – 28 January 2006) was a Finnish Lutheran clergyman and politician. He was a member of the Parliament of Finland from 1975 to 1987, representing the National Coalition Party.

References

1929 births
2006 deaths
People from Ranua
20th-century Finnish Lutheran clergy
National Coalition Party politicians
Members of the Parliament of Finland (1975–79)
Members of the Parliament of Finland (1979–83)
Members of the Parliament of Finland (1983–87)
University of Helsinki alumni